is a railway station in Mihara, Hiroshima Prefecture, Japan.

Lines
West Japan Railway Company
 Kure Line

Buildings

Surrounding Area
  National Route 185

References

Railway stations in Hiroshima Prefecture
Railway stations in Japan opened in 1930